Severe Tropical Cyclone Winston was the most intense tropical cyclone in the Southern Hemisphere on record, as well as the strongest to make landfall on record, and the most intense tropical cyclone worldwide in 2016. Winston was, at the time, the costliest tropical cyclone on record in the South Pacific basin, until it was surpassed by Cyclone Gabrielle in 2023. The system was first noted as a tropical disturbance on 7 February 2016, when it was located to the northwest of Port Vila, Vanuatu. Over the next few days, the system gradually developed as it moved southeast, acquiring gale-force winds by 11 February. Less favourable environmental conditions prompted weakening thereafter. After turning northeast on 14 February, Winston stalled to the north of Tonga on 17 February. Due to a change in higher level steering, the storm drifted back to the west. In the process, Winston again rapidly intensified, reaching Category 5 intensity on both the Australian tropical cyclone scale and the Saffir–Simpson hurricane wind scale on 19 February.

Thereafter, the storm slowly weakened within a less favourable environment; the system turned southeast during this time, though remained well away from Fiji. It later degenerated into a remnant low, with some subtropical characteristics, on 24 February as it turned to the west and later northwest. The system persisted for more than a week over the Coral Sea before ultimately moving over Queensland, Australia and dissipating on 3 March, 26 days after being classified a tropical disturbance.

In advance of the storm's arrival in Fiji, numerous shelters were opened, and a nationwide curfew was instituted during the evening of 20 February. Striking Fiji at Category 5 intensity on 20 February, Winston inflicted extensive damage on many islands and killed 44 people. Communications were temporarily lost with at least six islands, with some remaining isolated more than two days after the storm's passage. A total of 40,000 homes were damaged or destroyed and approximately 350,000 people—roughly 40 percent of Fiji's population—were significantly impacted by the storm. Total damage from Winston amounted to FJ$2.98 billion (US$1.4 billion). The nation's government declared a state of emergency on 20 February, which remained in place for 60 days. Immediately following the cyclone, the governments of Australia and New Zealand provided logistical support and relief packages. In the following weeks, a coalition of international support, including intergovernmental agencies, brought tens of millions of dollars in aid and hundreds of tons of supplies to residents in Fiji.

Background
Though frequented by tropical cyclones in general, the main islands of Fiji—Viti Levu and Vanua Levu—are seldom impacted by intense storms like Winston. Before Winston, the strongest storm to affect the main islands since records began in 1941 was Evan in December 2012, which skirted the western coast of Viti Levu as a Category 4 system on both the Australian scale and the Saffir–Simpson hurricane wind scale. Winston is the deadliest storm to affect the nation of Fiji since Cyclone Meli in 1979, which claimed 53 lives.
 
The relative lack of strong tropical cyclones affecting the capital city of Suva, located along the southeastern coast of Viti Levu, led to complacency among residents. Many assume that strong storms are confined to northern and western areas. With Winston approaching Fiji from the east and directly threatening Suva as a Category 5 severe tropical cyclone, Angela Fritz of The Washington Post called the storm a worst-case scenario.

Meteorological history

Origins and initial peak intensity
Over the next few days the system moved southeast and gradually developed further within a favourable environment. Embedded within a northwesterly deep layer mean flow, the system tracked southeast. Around 12:00 UTC on the same day, Winston intensified into a Category 2 tropical cyclone, as a small, well-defined eye developed within deepening convection.

Soon thereafter, increasing wind shear prompted weakening; convection waned and became increasingly ragged in appearance. On 14 February, Winston turned to the northeast as a subtropical ridge positioned itself to the north.

Weakening and northeast turn
Persistent wind shear displaced convection from the center of Winston, leaving its circulation partially exposed. As a result, the system degraded below severe tropical cyclone status by 00:00 UTC on 15 February. Conditions became more favourable for development on 16 February when shear relaxed over the cyclone. A prominent banding feature wrapped into the circulation that day, marking the start of reintensification. An eye reformed later that day within increasing convection, and Winston regained severe tropical cyclone intensity by 18:00 UTC. The storm's core became increasingly compact and defined as it strengthened, and a central dense overcast became established on 17 February. Later that day, Winston entered a region of weak steering currents and the storm became nearly stationary. The storm's eye became more readily apparent late on 17 February, as it doubled back to the west.

Peak intensity and Fiji landfall

A strengthening ridge to the south propelled Winston west by 18 February, directing the intensifying cyclone at Fiji. The storm's eye grew in size that day, and upper-level outflow became more defined. Winston's overall structure became increasingly symmetric, and the system acquired traits of an annular tropical cyclone. Winston acquired Category 5 status—the highest level on the Australian intensity scale—by 06:00 UTC, with ten-minute sustained winds reaching . Around this time, the cyclone passed directly over the small island of Vanua Balavu.

At peak intensity, it revealed a fairly symmetric convective structure with a  round eye, under low vertical wind shear easily offset by strong divergence aloft; moreover, sea surface temperatures remained warm, near . Winston soon made landfall in the Rakiraki District on Viti Levu at peak intensity, making it the only known Category 5 storm, on both the Australian tropical cyclone scale and the Saffir-Simpson scale, to directly impact Fiji, and therefore the most intense storm on record to strike the nation. It also marked the strongest landfall by any cyclone in the South Pacific basin, and one of the strongest landfalls worldwide. Despite deteriorating slightly while crossing the northern portion of Viti Levu, Winston remained well-organised, reforming a ragged and cloud-filled eye after re-emerging into open waters.

Final weakening and demise

Still under favorable conditions, Winston maintained intensity until early on 21 February, when upwelling of cooler waters beneath the decelerating cyclone caused it to weaken into a Category 4 cyclone. On 22 February, Winston sharply recurved south-southeastwards as the primary steering mechanism shifted from a ridge retrograding westwards to a ridge building to the east; moreover, dry air hindered reintensification. Very strong vertical wind shear and cooling sea surface temperatures resulted in steady weakening, and Winston dropped below severe tropical cyclone intensity on 23 February. Later, the low-level circulation center became fully exposed with shallow convection sheared to the south. As the system weakened, the relatively shallow subtropical ridge began to steer it southwestwards. Late on 24 February, when Winston entered TCWC Wellington's area of responsibility, the JTWC issued the final warning and indicated subtropical characteristics, citing the weakening mid-level warm core and the expanding wind field.

MetService claimed that Winston transitioned into an extratropical cyclone southeast of New Caledonia with gale-force winds at 00:00 UTC on 25 February, yet the JTWC continued to classify Winston as a subtropical system. On 26 February, beneath an upper-level low which produced subsidence aloft and high vertical wind shear, Winston revealed a strong low-level warm core and a weak upper-level cold core. The post-tropical cyclone moved into the Australian region basin in the afternoon, where it began to weaken once again. Although Winston began to move northwestwards and track over warmer sea surface temperature since 27 February, unfavourable upper-level conditions as well as dry air prevented reintensification. The system continued to track off the coast of Queensland, Australia as a weak and shallow system. The Australian Bureau of Meteorology reported that Winston had eventually transitioned into a tropical low and made landfall over the coast north of Cairns, at 1200 UTC on 3 March, locally at night. Winston soon degenerated into a trough over land.

Impact

Effects in Fiji

On 14 February, the FMS began issuing tropical cyclone warnings for the southern Lau Islands of Fiji. These gradually expanded in coverage through 15 February, but were discontinued on 16 February, as Winston moved away from the nation. Warnings were resumed on 18 February, after Winston doubled back toward Fiji, and were issued for the northern and eastern islands. Most of the northern islands in the storm's immediate path were placed under hurricane warnings on 19 February. All shelters across the Southern Lau Islands, Koro Island, and Taveuni were opened on 19 February; more than 700 shelters opened across the entirety of Fiji. The Republic of Fiji Military Forces were placed on standby for relief efforts. A state of emergency was declared during the afternoon of 20 February, and remained in place until 20 April. A nationwide curfew was enacted starting at 6:00 p.m. local time. Public transportation was suspended across Viti Levu, and the Fiji Roads Authority strongly advised residents to avoid travel unless necessary. Prime Minister Frank Bainimarama called the storm "an ordeal of the most grievous kind".

Striking the nation on 20 February, Winston brought widespread damage to numerous islands. Approximately 80 percent of the nation's 900,000 people lost power, including the entirety of Vanua Levu, as hurricane-force winds downed trees and power lines. Communications with Vanua Balavu, Lakeba, Cicia, Nayau, Taveuni, and Qamea were lost on 20 February. Contact with Vanua Balavu had yet to be established as of the evening of 22 February. Landline telephone service was lost on Matuku Island. A total of 44 people were killed across the nation: 21 in the Western Division, 15 in the Eastern Division, 6 in the Central Division, and 2 in the Northern Division. An additional 126 were injured. An estimated 350,000 people—the nation's total population was 837,721 as of the 2007 census—were affected by the storm.

Fiji's Eastern Division was the first to be struck by Winston, with many islands sustaining catastrophic damage. Entire communities were destroyed and approximately 40,000 people required immediate assistance. Koro Island sustained severe damage, with schools destroyed and many structures losing their roofs. Kade Village was leveled, with nearly all structures destroyed. One individual died in Nabasovi when his home collapsed, and twelve people were injured in Nabuna.  Another woman on the island later died in the hospital from injuries she sustained. A total of 788 homes were destroyed and 234 were damaged across Koro Island, rendering more than 3,000 people homeless. Significant damage was reported across Ovalau, where maximum water run-up reached . Across Taveuni Island, 722 homes were destroyed and 837 were damaged at an estimated cost of FJ$11.2 million (US$5.29 million). The two main ports on Taveuni were severely damaged and largely rendered unusable. Southern areas of the island became isolated when a bridge was destroyed. A communication tower on Mago Island, owned by Mel Gibson, collapsed. In Lomaiviti Province alone, the storm created 42,000 tons of debris.

On Viti Levu, strong winds destroyed at least two homes in Waidamu; the Waidamu River also topped its banks and flooded nearby communities. In Drauniivi village, 64 homes were completely destroyed and 70 more sustained damage. Hundreds of homes were destroyed in and around Rakiraki Town, with the area described as a scene of devastation and despair by the Fiji Times. Maximum wave run-up reached  in Nukubalavu.

Throughout Fiji, a total of 40,000 homes were damaged or destroyed. The Western Division accounted for the majority of damage, with 6,954 homes destroyed and 11,234 damaged. This left approximately 131,000 people in need of immediate shelter assistance. In addition, 229 schools were severely damaged or destroyed. Total damage from the storm amounted to FJ$2.98 billion (US$1.4 billion). However, despite the massive damage caused by Winston, the main tourism sector was largely spared.

Other South Pacific nations

Impacting Tonga twice within the span of a few days, Winston caused significant damage across northern Tonga. Approximately 2,500 people sought refuge in shelters. The first passage of the storm resulted in mostly crop damage while the second brought greater structural damage. At least 10 homes were destroyed and 200 more were damaged. Agriculture sustained significant damage, with 85–95 percent of the banana crop and most of the vanilla crop on Vava'u lost. Winston also affected Niue on 16 February; the FMS also issued tropical cyclone and damaging heavy swell warnings for the island nation.

The nation of Tonga also received money and aid as well as medical supplies from New Zealand, which also provided 8,000 people with clean water. Australia also provided assistance to Tonga, including the distribution of A$300,000 worth of humanitarian supplies through the Tonga Red Cross Society, two surveillance and assessment aircraft, and two disaster management experts from the Australian Civilian Corps to aid in relief efforts.

Beaches at Gold Coast and Sunshine Coast were closed on 26 and 27 February due to dangerous conditions. At least 15 people sustained injuries, ranging from dislocated shoulders to broken legs, due to rough conditions. A bodyboarder was reported missing near Tallebudgera; a helicopter search failed to locate anyone and the search was called off until a missing person report was filed. Severe storms on 29 February associated with the outer bands of Winston's remnants brought locally heavy rains to parts of Queensland.  of rain fell in Garbutt, while  of rain was observed in Townsville in the space of 1 hour. On 3 March heavy rain began to fall in north Queensland as Winston's remnants moved ashore near Cairns. Accumulations reached  in the small town of Feluga.

Aftermath

Cyclone Winston's devastating impact across Fiji rendered tens of thousands homeless, and prompted a major international humanitarian response. An estimated 350,000 people (40 percent of the nation's population) were moderately or severely affected by the storm, including 120,000 children. Approximately 250,000 people required water, sanitation, and hygiene (WASH) assistance due to power outages and damaged infrastructure. Through the evening of 26 February, approximately 62,000 people were housed evacuation centres across the country, primarily in the Western Division. This number steadily fell to 29,237 by 4 March, though thousands more stayed with relatives. The Governments of Australia, France, and New Zealand quickly responded with a large-scale relief effort within days of the storm's passage. Several other nations provided donations, supplies and funds, as did various international organizations.

Local
All schools across Fiji suspended classes for at least a week, two weeks for those in the hardest-hit areas because of severe damage to the educational infrastructure. Hundreds of schools resumed activities on 29 February. All but 23 schools resumed classes by 8 March across the nation. In Labasa, two people were arrested for breaking curfew and others were reprimanded. The main airport serving the country, Nadi International Airport, was closed as a result of the cyclone. It was re-opened two days after the storm to allow the humanitarian supplies to be received and tourists to leave. The nation's government deployed two ships to Koro Island carrying assessment teams and emergency supplies. Rakiraki Town was shut down to travel at 7:30 a.m. local time on 23 February to allow crews to clear debris from roads.

The Fiji Electricity Authority estimated that it would take three weeks to restore service to most of the Western Division. Digicel set up battery charging stations in Suva on 22 February. The company quickly restored telephone service to the main islands within two days of the storm. The spread of breeding grounds for mosquitos brought on by the storm led to an increase in dengue fever cases, with 131 incidents reported after Winston's passage. Ultimately, no large-scale outbreak resulted from the storm. Vegetable prices saw marked increases in price, in some cases by 500 percent, following Winston.

On 22 February, Prime Minister Frank Bainimarama established a disaster relief fund and requested donations. Fiji Airways provided FJ$1 million (US$465,000), MWH Global donated FJ$100,000, retailer Jack's of Fiji donated FJ$100,000 (US$50,000) and an equal amount worth of clothing. Digicel pledged FJ$150,000 (US$70,000) on 27 February and provided another FJ$50,000 (US$23,000) to the National Disaster Management Office. Three music bands from Koro Island–Voqa Ni Delai Dokidoki, Malumu Ni Tobu, and Savu Ni Delai Lomai–held a benefit concert in Suva on 29 February, with all donations to be donated to the Fijian Prime Minister's Relief and Rehabilitation Fund. Under the Social Welfare's Poverty Benefit Scheme and Care and Protection Allowance, the Government of Fiji allocated FJ$19.9 million (US$9.42 million) to 43,624 families.

In the three weeks following Winston, Empower Pacific provided approximately 7,000 people with psychological support and counseling.

On 9 April, Prime Minister Bainimarama unveiled a FJ$70 million (US$34 million) housing reconstruction initiative called "Help for Homes" targeted at lower income families—with an annual household income less than FJ$50,000 (US$24,000)—that could not afford repair costs.

International

The Government of China provided US$100,000 on 23 February, and a further US$1 million on 4 March. India supplied US$1 million as immediate assistance, and also deployed a C-17 Globemaster III carrying 40 tons of aid. A further US$300,000 was provided by the Then India Sanmarga Ikya Sangam, of which US$25,000 was given to the Fijian Prime Minister's Disaster Relief Fund. The Government of South Korea provided FJ$107,000 (US$50,000) and GIMCO Korea Ltd. donated FJ$50,000 (US$23,000). The Asian Development Bank provided US$2 million in assistance. The European Union provided FJ$10 million (US$4.6 million) through the Pacific Community for a short-term response. Vanuatu donated 10 million vatu (US$90,000). Indonesia pledged FJ$10.38 million (US$5 million) and would fund the reconstruction of Queen Victoria School, one of many schools destroyed by the storm. Others involved in humanitarian assistance in one way or another include Singapore, the United States, Japan, and Nauru.

On 21 February, members of International Red Cross and Red Crescent Societies (IFRC) began ground surveys to determine emergency needs. They also provided residents in poor communities and shelters with supplies. The Fiji chapter of the Red Cross launched a country-wide appeal for donations and supplies on 22 February. The IFRC released CHF 317,469 from their Disaster Relief Emergency Fund to support the Fijian Red Cross and 5,000 people in need of immediate aid. Relief teams from charities and non-governmental organizations including AmeriCares, Caritas International, MapAction, and ShelterBox were deployed to Fiji to assist with recovery efforts within a day of the storm. ShelterBox committed more than £1 million (US$1.4 million) to relief efforts. The International Organization for Migration allocated US$200,000 in immediate funds on 22 February. Oxfam placed members across the Southwestern Pacific on standby for deployment. Direct Relief provided  of medical supplies to hospitals across Fiji.

The IFRC launched an emergency appeal for the nation on 29 February seeking CHF 7 million to benefit 38,500 people over a period of 12 months. The United Nations Office for the Coordination of Humanitarian Affairs (UNOCHA) launched an appeal for US$38.6 million—including US$7.1 million for UNICEF projects—on 4 March. International donations of items and technical assistance reached US$22 million and cash donations amounted to US$9 million by this date. Stephen O'Brien, head of UNOCHA, released US$8 million from the UN's Central Emergency Response Fund. WASH supplies were distributed to 26,125 people by this date.

FRANZ agreement

In accordance with the FRANZ agreement, Australia, France, and New Zealand coordinated relief efforts to help Fiji. On 21 February, the government of New Zealand set aside an initial NZ$50,000 (US$34,000) to the High Commission of the Republic of the Fiji Islands to New Zealand in preparation for relief efforts, alongside NZ$170,000 (US$114,000) worth of relief supplies. The RNZAF deployed a Lockheed P-3 Orion, C-130 Hercules and a Boeing 757 with a team of New Zealand Army engineers and firefighters with a specialist SAR tea RNZN ships carrying two air force NH-90 helicopters deployed to Fiji to assist in relief efforts. RNZAF P-3 Orion was sent immediately to the area to aid in aerial surveillance and assessments of the damage situation in Fiji. New Zealand Minister of Foreign Affairs Murray McCully toured Fiji on 29 February and described the damage as "an endless sea of [airplane] crashes". Total aid was increased to NZ$4.7 million (US$3.1 million) by 1 March, including a boost of NZ$1.5 million (US$1 million) immediately following McCully's visit. HMNZS Wellington arrived in Vanua Balavu with 60 tonnes of aid on 29 February, nine days after Winston struck the island. The larger HMNZS Canterbury arrived at the island several days later, bringing 270 NZDF personnel and 106 tons of supplies. The crew of the Canterbury were later praised by residents of Vanua Balavu for their rehabilitation work.

Australia provided an immediate relief package worth A$5 million (US$3.6 million) on 22 February, which increased to A$33.7 million (US$26.1 million) by 21 April  HMAS Canberra, carrying three helicopters and 60 tons of aid, arrived on 1 March. Forty members of the Royal Australian Air Force were deployed to Nausori on 27 February, and twenty-two medical personnel were sent at other times. More than 200 personnel of the Australian Defence Forces assisted recovery efforts across Fiji for two months before returning home in April. France deployed two CASA/IPTN CN-235 aircraft from New Caledonia, loaded with emergency supplies; they flew along supply routes to Taveuni and Vanua Levu. On 9 March, the French patrol boat La Moqueuse arrived in Suva with 2 tonnes of supplies—shelter and hygiene kits—and 14 engineers. The Government of New Caledonia pledged FJ$300,000 (US$142,000) in support to UNICEF and the territory's South Province pledged FJ$400,000 (US$189,000) to support education.

Retirement
During November 2016, the WMO retired the name Winston due to the storm's extensive damage to the South Pacific islands and was subsequently replaced by the name Wanita.

See also

List of the most intense tropical cyclones
Cyclone Mahina – The most intense tropical cyclone recorded in the Southern Hemisphere
Cyclone Rewa
Cyclone Zoe – The second-most intense tropical cyclone recorded in the South Pacific basin
Cyclone Pam
Cyclone Oscar
Cyclone Daman
Cyclone Gita
Cyclone Harold - a strong cyclone in 2020 and the strongest cyclone to impact Fiji as a Category 5 severe tropical cyclone since Winston.

References

External links

ReliefWeb disaster page on Cyclone Winston

2015–16 South Pacific cyclone season
2015–16 Australian region cyclone season
2016 in Australia
2016 in Fiji
Category 5 South Pacific cyclones
Tropical cyclones in Queensland
Tropical cyclones in Fiji
Tropical cyclones in Niue
Tropical cyclones in Tonga
Tropical cyclones in Vanuatu
February 2016 events in Oceania
Retired South Pacific cyclones
Winston